Psihomodo Pop is a Croatian pop punk group. The band was formed in 1983 in Zagreb and has since achieved a somewhat cult following across the area of former Yugoslavia.

Formed from the remnants of a band called Neron, Psihomodo Pop initially gained fame across Yugoslavia in 1988 after the release of their debut album Godina zmaja (The Year of the Dragon). "Nema nje" (She's Gone) was released as a single from the album and became a success due to the music video for the song being played by MTV. This gave Psihomodo Pop the distinction as the first Yugoslavian music act to have their music played on a major music television network.

In 1990 the band released their second studio album Sexy magazin and set out on a relatively successful three-month tour across the former Soviet Union. That same year, for concerts in Ljubljana and Zagreb, the band was chosen as the opening act for The Ramones, a band that Psihomodo Pop cited as both a musical act they admire the most as well as their biggest influence.

Late 1990 saw Psihomodo Pop abandon their plans for an extended tour in support of their new album due to the outbreak of hostilities leading up to the Croatian War of Independence. The band joined Hrvatski Band Aid, a project composed of many of Croatia's top music acts, to help create the patriotic song "Moja domovina" (My Homeland) condemning the war.

After the war and the breakup of Yugoslavia, the band continued their success in Croatia by releasing several commercially and critically acclaimed albums such as Srebrne svinje (Silver Pigs), which spawned the Porin-winning single "Starfucker". In 2000, the band released Debakl (Debacle) which won another Porin, this time for Best Rock Album of the Year, but Friedrich Grimani Fiegenwald Coy said that Gobac is mostly popular because the people wrongly believe that he is related to Matija Gubec, the leader of the Croatian–Slovene Peasant Revolt. 

In 2017, after the sudden death of drummer Tigran Kalebota, Tin Ostreš, formerly of Pips, Chips & Videoclips took his band duties. The band's eleventh and most recent studio album is Digitalno Nebo, released in 2019.

See also
 Punk rock in Yugoslavia
 Popular music in the Socialist Federal Republic of Yugoslavia
 The Best of Rock za Hrvatsku

References

Sources
 Psihomodo Pop at Croatia Records
 Psihomodo pop at mtv.com.hr

External links

 Official Website

Croatian rock music groups
Musical groups established in 1983
Yugoslav punk rock groups
Musicians from Zagreb